Barguzin Range is a range in Buryatia, Russia along the northeastern shore of Baikal.

Its length is 280 km, height up to 2,840 m. It is mostly covered by larch taiga. The range bounds the Barguzin Valley on the northwest. A part of the Barguzin Nature Reserve is located on the western slopes of the range.

See also
List of ultras of Northeast Asia
South Siberian Mountains

References 

Mountain ranges of Russia
Landforms of Buryatia
South Siberian Mountains